Joshua Michael Kindred (born 1977) is an American lawyer and jurist serving as a U.S. district judge on the United States District Court for the District of Alaska.

Education 

Kindred graduated from the University of Alaska Anchorage in 2002 with a Bachelor of Arts. He then attended the Willamette University College of Law, where he was editor-in-chief of the Willamette Law Review. He graduated in 2005 with a Juris Doctor degree.

Legal career 

After law school, Kindred served as a law clerk to chief justice Paul De Muniz of the Oregon Supreme Court from 2005 to 2007. He was in private practice with the Seattle-based law firm Lane Powell from 2007 to 2008. From 2008 to 2013, Kindred served as an assistant district attorney and violent unit supervisor for Alaska. He was environmental counsel to the Alaska Oil and Gas Association from 2013 to 2018, and from 2018 to 2020 he was the regional solicitor for the U.S. Department of the Interior's Alaska Region.

Federal judicial service 

On October 16, 2019, President Donald Trump announced his intent to nominate Kindred to serve as a United States district judge for the United States District Court for the District of Alaska. On November 21, 2019, his nomination was sent to the Senate. President Trump nominated Kindred to the seat vacated by Judge Ralph Beistline, who assumed senior status on December 31, 2015. A hearing on his nomination before the Senate Judiciary Committee was held on December 4, 2019.
Alaska's Senators Dan Sullivan and Lisa Murkowski congratulated Kindred on his nomination. On January 3, 2020, his nomination was returned to the President under Rule XXXI, Paragraph 6 of the United States Senate. Later that day, he was re-nominated to the same seat. On January 16, 2020, his nomination was reported out of committee by a 12–10 vote. On February 11, 2020, the Senate voted 52–41 to invoke cloture on his nomination. On February 12, 2020, his nomination was confirmed by a 54–41 vote. He received his judicial commission on February 18, 2020.

References

External links 

1977 births
Living people
21st-century American judges
21st-century American lawyers
Alaska lawyers
District attorneys
Judges of the United States District Court for the District of Alaska
People from Goldsboro, North Carolina
United States district court judges appointed by Donald Trump
University of Alaska Anchorage alumni
Willamette University College of Law alumni